The Autódromo José Carlos Pace, better known as Interlagos, is a  motorsport circuit located in the city of São Paulo, in the neighborhood of Interlagos. It was inaugurated on 12 May 1940, by the federal intervener Adhemar de Barros. The traditional name of the circuit and of the neighborhood itself comes from the fact that it is located in a region between two large artificial lakes, Guarapiranga and Billings, which were built in the beginning of the 20th century to supply the city with water and electricity. In 1985 the circuit was renamed to honor the Formula 1 driver José Carlos Pace, who died in a plane crash in 1977. Attached to its facilities there is a Kart circuit named after Ayrton Senna. The circuit runs counterclockwise.

It is internationally known for hosting the Formula 1 Brazilian Grand Prix stage and the Lollapalooza music festival. It has hosted the Formula One Brazilian Grand Prix since 1973. It also hosted the Brazilian motorcycle Grand Prix in 1992, the Deutsche Tourenwagen Meisterschaft in 1996, the FIA GT1 World Championship in 2010, and the FIA World Endurance Championship from 2012 to 2014. As the major racetrack in the country it also hosted many previous and active national championships such as Stock Car Brasil, Campeonato Sudamericano de GT, Fórmula Truck, Copa Truck, Formula 3 Sudamericana, Brazilian Formula Three Championship, and Mil Milhas Brasil. In addition, the Prova Ciclística 9 de Julho road cycling race was held at the venue from 2002 to 2006 and from 2008 to 2013.

History

The land on which the circuit is located was originally bought in 1926 by property developers who wanted to build housing. Following difficulties partly due to the 1929 stock market crash, it was decided to build a racing circuit instead, construction started in 1938 and the track was inaugurated on 12 May 1940. The design was inspired by the tracks of Indianapolis Motor Speedway and Roosevelt Raceway (1937 layout) in the United States, Brooklands in England, and Montlhéry in France.

The traditional name of the circuit (literally, "between lakes") comes from its location on the neighborhood of Interlagos, a region between two large artificial lakes, Guarapiranga and Billings, which were built in the early 20th century to supply the city with water and electric power. The name of this region was suggested by the French architect and urban planner Alfred Agache after the Interlaken region located in Switzerland. It was renamed in 1985 from "Autódromo de Interlagos" to its current name to honor the Brazilian Formula One driver José Carlos Pace, who died in a plane crash in 1977.

Formula One started racing there in 1972, the first year being a non-championship race, won by Argentinean Carlos Reutemann. The first World Championship Brazilian Grand Prix was held at Interlagos in 1973, the race won by defending Formula One World Champion and São Paulo local Emerson Fittipaldi. Fittipaldi won the race again the following year in bad weather and Brazilian driver José Carlos Pace won his only race at Interlagos in 1975.

Due to safety concerns with the  circuit, including the bumpy track surface and the inadequate barriers, deep ditches, and embankments, the last Formula One race held on the original Interlagos was in 1980, the race was nearly cancelled after protests by many Formula One drivers including defending world champion Jody Scheckter. The safety concerns were directed towards the track surface, which BBC commentator Murray Walker described as "appallingly bumpy". Most of the ground-effect cars of 1980 were designed in such a way that bumpy surfaces were barely tolerable for the drivers. These factors meant that Formula One would move back to the Jacarepaguá circuit in Rio de Janeiro, hometown of established star Nelson Piquet and where the Brazilian Grand Prix was held in 1978. After Formula One moved away, the only major race being held at Interlagos was the Mil Milhas Brasil, and the last major race on the original circuit was the 1989 Mil Milhas Brasil. Formula One returned to the circuit in 1990 after it had been shortened and modified at a cost of $15 million. The track layout, aside from the pit exit being extended along the "Curva do Sol" over the years has remained the same since 1990. The ascendancy of another São Paulo local, Ayrton Senna, has also influenced the return of Formula One to Interlagos, and it has stayed there ever since.
    
The circuit is often witness to dramatic results when it hosts the Formula One Brazilian Grand Prix, especially since its move to an end of season slot in 2004. Fernando Alonso won both the 2005 and 2006 world titles in Brazil, with Renault also clinching the constructors' title in 2006. Kimi Räikkönen won the 2007 World Championship here after being seven points down and in third place in the championship entering the final race of the season. Felipe Massa almost won the 2008 Driver's World Championship when he finished the 2008 Brazilian Grand Prix as winner, but after he finished, Lewis Hamilton overtook Timo Glock and was crowned World Champion. Despite Rubens Barrichello's pole position in 2009, Mark Webber won the race and Jenson Button won the championship for Brawn after starting 14th. Williams got their first pole since 2005 here at the 2010 Brazilian Grand Prix with Nico Hülkenberg. The race was won by Sebastian Vettel, and with Mark Webber coming second, Red Bull secured the constructors title; however the driver's title was not confirmed until the last race of the season.

Characteristics

One the main characteristics of Interlagos is that it was not built on flat terrain, but follows the ups and downs of hilly ground, which makes it harder to drive and demands more power from the cars' engines. The races therefore can be tough on the car and physically demanding on the drivers, especially since the circuit runs counterclockwise, where the centrifugal forces in the many hard left turns push the drivers' necks to the right, instead of left as in most of the circuits on the F1 calendar. The hilly course is also a good feature for road cycling races, which are usually held at the circuit.

Additionally to the physical aspects there is also a climate component to the venue, the region where the track is located is known for having rapid changes in weather with outbursts of rain being common, which can vary from a short lived drizzle to a torrential storm. This can add a degree of unpredictability to the races and it's classic associated with the circuit. The city of São Paulo itself where Interlagos is located is known by the nickname "Land of the Drizzle".

First reform

In 1979 upgrading work was done and the pit lane was extended past the first left-hand turn (1), making the corner more narrow, and the pit lane ended right in the middle of turn 1 and 2. As a consequence of the reduction, the track lost three long straight sections and nine fast curves (5 were lost forever, 4 were made slower and are still present). The original track was full of fast corners and it allowed cars to keep maximum speed for up for many seconds, it was considered dangerous, and in 1990 the old layout was mostly revised. The new track still had a very long top-speed section that contained bumps, high-speed turns and little run-off area though the track was very wide at this point.

Improvement in 2007
For the 2007 Brazilian Grand Prix, the largest-scale repairs in the last 35 years were carried out at the circuit, to fundamentally solve problems with the track surface. The existing asphalt was entirely replaced, resulting in a much smoother track surface. At the same time, the pit lane entrance was enhanced to improve safety and to add a new fixed grand stand. To facilitate the work, the circuit was closed and no events were held in the five months immediately preceding the race.

On 17 October 2007, Companhia Paulista de Trens Metropolitanos (CPTM) began to operate the new station of the Line C (currently called Line 9), Autódromo, near the circuit. The Line C had been extended to improve the access between the center of São Paulo and southern region of the Greater São Paulo including the circuit, improving circuit accessibility.

Planned 2012 redevelopment
Shortly before the 2011 Brazilian Grand Prix, FIA race director Charlie Whiting detailed several planned upgrades of the circuit, including a new pit entrance and expanded run-off at the final corner, as a response to several fatal accidents at the circuit in 2011. In June 2012, further details of the proposed plans emerged, calling for the construction of a brand new pit building and the relocation of the start line from its current position between Arquibancadas and the Senna 'S' to Reta Oposta. However, later it was decided to keep start/finish straight at its current location along with the new pit building.

Pit lane
Interlagos has one of the longest pit-lanes ever used in Formula One, starting just before the start-finish straight and rejoining the main course after Curva do Sol. Entering the pits was originally not a trivial task, as the high speed and the left turning may force the car rightwards, out of the pits. The pit lane entrance received some changes to become safer for the 2007 Formula One Brazilian Grand Prix, and later for the 2014 Formula One Brazilian Grand Prix, when a chicane was added.

Layout history

Track layout

Race start is in the "Tribunas" section and features a long straight with an upward inclination, then comes "S do Senna" (the Senna S) [1,2], a pair of alternating downward turns (left then right) that exhibit different attack angles and inclinations.

"S do Senna" connects with "Curva do Sol" (Curve of the Sun) [3], a round-shaped large-radius left turn that leads to "Reta Oposta" (Opposite Straight) the track's longest (but not the fastest) straight. Reta Oposta is succeeded by a pair of downhill left turns that are called "Descida do Lago" (Lake's Descent) [4,5] into a short straight section that climbs up towards the back of the pit buildings.

This is followed by a slow section, with small, kart-like turns and elevation changes. The first of these turns is known as "Ferradura" (Horseshoe) [6,7] downhill and right into "Laranjinha" (Little Orange) [8], another right turn and the slowest point of the circuit; the next turn leads into "Pinheirinho" (Little Pine Tree) [9], left on a plain field; then comes "Bico de Pato" (Duck Bill) [10] a right turn with a tight hairpin like shape; and then "Mergulho" (Dive) [11], a constant-radius left-hand turn that slings the driver straight into a harder left at "Junção" (Junction) [12].

Turn [13] "Café" (Coffee), is a left up-hill kink and marks the start of the long top-speed section. Rising up through "Subida dos Boxes" (Up to the Pits) [14], the driver encounters a long uphill left turn with a gradient of 10% that demands a lot of power from the cars. At the end of it comes Arquibancadas (Bleachers) [15], a wide high velocity left turn that connects to the "Tribunas" straight to complete the final section of the track.

The series of left turns from the exit of "Junção" all the way to Turn 1 is typically taken at full throttle and treated as a long straight. This section is one of the longest full-throttle stretches on the Formula 1 calendar, and thus demanding of the engine's reliability. Other notable stretches of this nature are the "Rettifilo Tribune" straight at Autodromo Nazionale di Monza and the Kemmel Straight at Circuit de Spa-Francorchamps.

List of the corners with their names (the numbers correspond to the current layout, from start to finish line):
 'S' do Senna (Senna S) (1,2)
 Curva do Sol (Curve of the Sun) (3)
 Descida do Lago (Lake's Descent) (4,5)
 Ferradura (Horseshoe) (6,7)
 Laranjinha (Little Orange) (8)
 Pinheirinho (Little Pine Tree) (9)
 Bico de Pato (Duck's Bill) (10)
 Mergulho (Dive) (11)
 Junção (Junction) (12)
 Café (Coffee) (13)
 Subida dos Boxes (Up to the Pits) (14)
 Arquibancadas (Bleachers) (15)

Events

 Current

 January: Mil Milhas Brasil
 March: Porsche Cup Brasil
 April: Stock Car Pro Series, Stock Series, F4 Brazilian Championship, Copa Truck, NASCAR Brasil Sprint Race
 June: TCR South America Touring Car Championship, TCR Brazil Touring Car Championship, Campeonato Brasileiro de Turismo Nacional
 July: Stock Car Pro Series, Fórmula Truck, Copa HB20
 August: Copa Truck, NASCAR Brasil Sprint Race
 November: Formula One São Paulo Grand Prix, Porsche Cup Brasil, F4 Brazilian Championship
 December: Stock Car Pro Series Super Final BRB, Stock Series, Copa HB20

 Former

 Brazilian Formula Three Championship (2014–2017)
 Campeonato Sudamericano de GT (2007–2013)
 FIA GT1 World Championship (2010)
 FIA World Endurance Championship 6 Hours of São Paulo (2012–2014)
 Fórmula Academy Sudamericana (2018–2019)
 Formula 3 Brazil Open (2010–2014)
 Formula 3 Sudamericana (1987, 1989–1993, 1995, 1998–1999, 2003–2011, 2013)
 Formula One Brazilian Grand Prix (1972–1977, 1979–1980, 1990–2019)
 Grand Prix motorcycle racing Brazilian motorcycle Grand Prix (1992)
 International Formula 3000 (2001–2002)
 International Touring Car Championship (1996)
 Le Mans Series (2007)
 Porsche Cup Brasil (2005–2022)
 Prova Ciclística 9 de Julho (2002–2006, 2008–2013)
 South American Super Touring Car Championship (1997–1999)
 Stock Car Corrida do Milhão (2010–2013, 2016, 2019–2020)
 TC2000 Championship (2007)
 Top Race V6 (2009–2010)
 World Series by Nissan (2002)

Lap records
The official fastest lap records at the Autódromo José Carlos Pace are listed as:

See also
 Interlagos
 Cidade Dutra
 Socorro
 Roman Catholic Diocese of Santo Amaro
 Subprefecture of Capela do Socorro

References

External links 

 Official website 
 Info from the Official Formula 1 Website
 Official Brazilian Grand Prix website (English site)
 SaoPauloEsportes.com
 Info from BBC's circuit guide
 Autodromo Jose Carlos Pace History and Statistics
 Autódromo José Carlos Pace on Google Maps (Current Formula 1 Tracks)
 Ciro Pabón's Racetracks 3D views and virtual laps of all F1 circuits, including this one, via Google Earth
 
 Subprefecture of Capela do Socorro

Jose Carlos Pace
Jose Carlos Pace
Jose Carlos Pace
Sports venues in São Paulo
Jose Carlos Pace